Canadian Film Makers may refer to:
Canadian Film Makers (1974 TV series)
Canadian Film Makers (1967 TV series)